Brit Awards 1999 was the 19th edition of the Brit Awards, an annual pop music awards ceremony in the United Kingdom. It was organised by the British Phonographic Industry and took place on 16 February 1999 at the London Arena in London.

Performances

Winners and nominees

Multiple nominations and awards

Notable moments

Belle & Sebastian (1999)
In 1999, indie band Belle & Sebastian were nominated for Best British Newcomers, despite having released three albums before the 1999 Awards. The award was sponsored by Radio One and voted for online by their listeners. At the time, Steps were arguably Britain's biggest boy/girl pop band and were also nominated. Despite this, the award was won by Belle & Sebastian. On the Saturday after the awards, a story appeared in the press alleging that the group had rigged the vote in their favour, encouraging students from two universities to vote online. However, fans argued that the band had a predominantly large student following, that band member Isobel Campbell had attended one of the universities in question, and in particular, the award ought to be given on artistic merit as opposed to popularity or CD sales.

References

External links
Brit Awards 1999 at Brits.co.uk

Brit Awards
Brit Awards, 1999
Brit Awards, 1999
Brit Awards
Brit
Brit Awards